Puerto Rico Highway 803 (PR-803) is a road that travels from Corozal to Naranjito, Puerto Rico. It begins at PR-164 in Palmarejo barrio and ends at its junction with PR-152 and PR-802 in Cedro Arriba barrio.

Major intersections

See also

 List of highways numbered 803

References

External links
 

803